The Minister of State for Skills, Apprenticeships and Higher Education, formerly the Parliamentary Under-Secretary of State for Skills, Further and Higher Education, previously the Minister of State for Universities, is a mid-level position in the Department for Education in the British government. It has been held by Robert Halfon since October 2022. The minister has oversight over skills and higher and further education, including universities and the Student Loans Company.

Under New Labour, the role was known as Minister of State for Higher Education and Minister of State for Innovation, Universities and Skills.

Under the Cameron–Clegg coalition and May ministries, the role became known as Minister of State for Universities, Science and Cities and Minister of State for Universities, Science, Research and Innovation. The role of Parliamentary Under-Secretary of State for Science, Research and Innovation was created out of this office.

Following the 2021 British cabinet reshuffle under the second Johnson ministry, the role was known as Minister of State for Higher and Further Education and the officeholder, Michelle Donelan, was given the right to attend Cabinet. Under Donelan's successor, Andrea Jenkyns, the position was demoted to Parliamentary Under-Secretary of State.

At certain times, the Minister worked in the Department for Business, Innovation and Skills.

History 
The minister once more attended cabinet after the 2021 British cabinet reshuffle.

Responsibilities 
The minister has the following responsibilities:
 Strategy for post-16 education
 Higher technical education (levels 4 and 5)
 Further education funding and accountability
 Lifelong learning entitlement
 Institutes of Technology and National Colleges
 Universities and higher education reform
 Higher education quality
 Student finance (including the Student Loans Company)
 Coronavirus (COVID-19) response for universities, higher education institutions and further education services (jointly with Parliamentary Under Secretary of State (Minister for Skills))

The position had increased prominence in 2020 and 2021 when the COVID-19 pandemic affected further education and university education.

List of Ministers of State for Higher and Further Education

References

See also 
 Secretary of State for Innovation, Universities and Skills

Department for Education
Higher education in the United Kingdom
Education ministers of the United Kingdom
Universities in the United Kingdom
Higher education ministers
British government officials
Department for Business, Innovation and Skills
2001 establishments in the United Kingdom